"In My Dreams" is a song by American heavy metal band Dokken, released in 1985 on the album Under Lock and Key. The song peaked at number 24 on the Hot Mainstream Rock Tracks chart and at number 77 on the Billboard Hot 100 in the United States.

Track listing
7" single

EP single

Charts

Cover versions
The song was covered by teen-pop/dance band The Party, featuring lead vocals by Deedee Magno, and released as a single in 1991, peaking at #34 on the Billboard Hot 100.

Personnel
 Don Dokken – lead vocals
 George Lynch – guitar
 Jeff Pilson – bass guitar, backing vocals
 Mick Brown – drums, backing vocals

See also
List of glam metal albums and songs

References

1985 songs
1986 singles
Dokken songs
Elektra Records singles
Songs written by Don Dokken
Songs written by George Lynch (musician)
Songs written by Jeff Pilson